The following low-power television stations broadcast on digital or analog channel 35 in the United States:

 K35AX-D in Hawthorne, Nevada
 K35BW-D in Lewiston, Idaho
 K35CH-D in Cortez/Mancos, etc., Colorado
 K35CK-D in Price, Utah
 K35CR-D in Tillamook, etc., Oregon
 K35CV-D in Shoshoni, Wyoming
 K35EE-D in Moccasin, Arizona
 K35EI-D in Dolan Springs, Arizona
 K35EM-D in Quitaque, Texas
 K35EW-D in Heber/Midway, Utah
 K35FI-D in Akron, Colorado
 K35FL-D in Silver Springs, Nevada
 K35FO-D in Milton-Freewater, Oregon
 K35FP in Tucumcari, New Mexico
 K35FS-D in Santa Clara, etc., Utah
 K35GA-D in La Grande, Oregon
 K35GD-D in Golconda, Nevada
 K35GG-D in Huntsville, etc., Utah
 K35GJ-D in Preston, Idaho
 K35GO-D in Haxtun, Colorado
 K35GR-D in Badger, South Dakota
 K35GU-D in Ruidoso, New Mexico
 K35HB-D in Deming, New Mexico
 K35HD-D in Soda Springs, Idaho
 K35HU-D in Grays River, Washington
 K35HW-D in Florence, Oregon
 K35IC-D in Bonners Ferry, Idaho
 K35II-D in South Point, Hawaii
 K35IJ-D in Hanna & Tabiona, Utah
 K35IK-D in Duchesne, Utah
 K35IQ-D in Vernal, etc., Utah
 K35IR-D in Garrison, etc., Utah
 K35IS-D in Peoa/Oakley, Utah
 K35IU-D in Frost, Minnesota
 K35IX-D in Basalt, Colorado
 K35IZ-D in Jackson, Minnesota
 K35JH-D in London Springs, Oregon
 K35JI-D in Orangeville, Utah
 K35JJ-D in Scofield, Utah
 K35JK-D in Fountain Green, Utah
 K35JN-D in Duluth, Minnesota
 K35JR-D in Arrey & Derry, New Mexico
 K35JS-D in Lamar, Colorado
 K35JT-D in Drummond, Montana
 K35JW-D in Bridger, etc., Montana
 K35JX-D in Westwood, California
 K35JY-D in Lamont, Oklahoma
 K35JZ-D in Alton, Utah
 K35KC-D in Great Falls, Montana
 K35KE-D in Hollis, Oklahoma
 K35KH-D in Walker, Minnesota
 K35KI-D in St. James, Minnesota
 K35KL-D in Manila, etc., Utah
 K35KM-D in Eureka, Nevada
 K35KX-D in Topeka, Kansas
 K35LA-D in Palm Springs, California
 K35LD-D in Prineville, Oregon
 K35LF-D in Eureka, California
 K35LJ-D in Crested Butte, Colorado
 K35MF-D in Big Spring, Texas
 K35MJ-D in Grangeville, Idaho
 K35MN-D in Omak, etc., Washington
 K35MQ-D in Weatherford, Oklahoma
 K35MS-D in Canyonville, etc., Oregon
 K35MT-D in Port Orford, Oregon
 K35MU-D in Cottonwood, etc., Arizona
 K35MV-D in Concho, Oklahoma
 K35MW-D in Lead, South Dakota
 K35MX-D in Kingman, Arizona
 K35MY-D in Birchdale, Minnesota
 K35MZ-D in Las Animas, Colorado
 K35NB-D in Polson, Montana
 K35NC-D in Hanksville, Utah
 K35ND-D in Rural Garfield, etc., Utah
 K35NE-D in Fremont, Utah
 K35NG-D in Escalante, Utah
 K35NK-D in Cannonville, Utah
 K35NL-D in Boulder, Utah
 K35NM-D in Caineville, Utah
 K35NN-D in Randolph & Woodruff, Utah
 K35NP-D in Kanarraville, New Harmony, Utah
 K35NQ-D in Mesa, Colorado
 K35NS-D in Montrose, Colorado
 K35NT-D in Parowan/Enoch/Para, Utah
 K35NU-D in Delta, Oak City, etc., Utah
 K35NV-D in Beryl/Newcastle/Modena, Utah
 K35NW-D in Beaver etc., Utah
 K35NX-D in Fillmore, etc., Utah
 K35NZ-D in Ninilchick, Alaska
 K35OA-D in Emery, Utah
 K35OB-D in Green River, Utah
 K35OC-D in Ferron, Utah
 K35OD-D in Clear Creek, Utah
 K35OH-D in Roseburg, Oregon
 K35OI-D in Starr Valley, Nevada
 K35OK-D in Julesburg, Colorado
 K35OL-D in Yuma, Colorado
 K35OM-D in La Veta, Colorado
 K35ON-D in Paonia, Colorado
 K35OO-D in Del Norte, Colorado
 K35OP-D in Park City, Utah
 K35OQ-D in San Luis, Colorado
 K35OR-D in Aguilar, Colorado
 K35OU-D in Tucson, Arizona
 K35OX-D in Selma, Alabama
 K35OY-D in Columbia, Missouri
 K35OZ-D in Chico, California
 K35PE-D in Snowmass Village, Colorado
 K35PK-D in Monterey, California
 K35PL-D in Roundup, Montana
 K35PO-D in Bismarck, North Dakota
 K40DG-D in Joplin, Montana
 K45GM-D in Blanding/Monticello, Utah
 K46IV-D in Antimony, Utah
 K48AH-D in Willmar, Minnesota
 K49CF-D in Fort Peck, Montana
 K50KF-D in Redwood Falls, Minnesota
 KABE-CD in Bakersfield, California
 KATH-LD in Juneau-Douglas, Alaska
 KAXW-LD in Mullin, Texas
 KAXX-LD in San Antonio, Texas
 KAZH-LD in McAllen, Texas
 KCFT-CD in Anchorage, Alaska
 KDHW-CD in Yakima, Washington
 KEGG-LD in Tulsa, Oklahoma
 KESE-LD in Yuma, Arizona
 KEXI-LD in Kalispell, Montana
 KFGX-LD in Fargo, North Dakota
 KFLU-LD in Fayetteville, Arkansas
 KFPH-CD in Phoenix, Arizona, an ATSC 3.0 station
 KGLR-LD in Sparks, Nevada
 KGO-TV (DRT) in San Jose, California
 KHBA-LD in Spokane, Washington
 KHPF-CD in Fredericksburg, Texas
 KJBO-LD in Wichita Falls, Texas
 KJBW-LD in Paragould, Arkansas
 KLFI-CD in Texarkana, Arkansas
 KNTL-LD in Laughlin, Nevada
 KORK-CD in Portland, Oregon
 KPBI-CD in Bentonville, Arkansas
 KPKN-LD in Tyler, Texas
 KQAF-LD in La Junta, Colorado
 KQAH-LD in Maltby, Washington
 KQML-LD in Kansas City, Missouri
 KRAH-CD in Paris, Arkansas
 KTSB-CA in Santa Maria, California
 KTXC-LD in Amarillo, Texas
 KVAT-LD in Austin, Texas 
 KVSD-LD in San Diego, California
 KVTE-LD in Las Vegas, Nevada
 KXPI-LD in Pocatello, Idaho
 KXSH-LD in Rochester, Minnesota
 KXZQ-LD in Durango, Colorado
 KZAK-LD in Boise, Idaho
 KZMM-CD in Fresno, California
 W35BB-D in Dublin, Georgia
 W35CK-D in Highlands, North Carolina
 W35CO-D in Burnsville, North Carolina
 W35CS-D in Ocean City, Maryland
 W35DH-D in Greenville, Florida
 W35DI-D in Roanoke, West Virginia
 W35DQ-D in Midland, Michigan
 W35DT-D in Beaver Dam, North Carolina
 W35DV-D in Augusta, Georgia
 W35DW-D in Greenville, North Carolina
 W35DY-D in Sterling-Dixon, Illinois
 W35DZ-D in Algood, Tennessee
 W35EC-D in Jennings, Florida
 W35ED-D in Florence, South Carolina
 WBND-LD in South Bend, Indiana
 WBVJ-LP in Valdosta, Georgia
 WCTZ-LD in Bowling Green, Kentucky
 WDES-CD in Miramar Beach, Florida
 WDTA-LD in Atlanta, Georgia
 WEAC-CD in Jacksonville, Alabama
 WECP-LD in Panama City, Florida
 WFCU-LD in Augusta, Georgia
 WFPA-CD in Philadelphia, Pennsylvania
 WHCT-LD in Hartford, New Haven, Connecticut
 WHVD-LD in Huntsville, Alabama
 WJDW-LD in Tazewell, Virginia
 WNHO-LD in Defiance, Ohio
 WNYF-CD in Watertown, New York
 WOLP-CD in Grand Rapids, Michigan, an ATSC 3.0 station
 WOTM-LD in Birmingham, Alabama
 WPBY-LD in Lafayette, Indiana
 WPDR-LD in Tomah, Wisconsin
 WRCZ-LD in Ocala, Florida
 WTAM-LD in Tampa, Florida
 WTMQ-LD in Jacksonville, North Carolina, to move to channel 32
 WTMV-LD in Ogden, North Carolina
 WUDL-LD in Detroit, Michigan
 WUVG-DT (DRT) in Athens, Georgia
 WVIR-CD in Charlottesville, Virginia
 WWLF-LD in Syracuse, New York
 WZCH-LD in Myrtle Beach, South Carolina

The following low-power stations, which are no longer licensed, formerly broadcast on digital or analog channel 35:
 K35BJ in Ellisford, etc., Washington
 K35BQ in Daggett, etc., California
 K35BR in Carlin, Nevada
 K35CE-D in Canadian, Texas
 K35CN in Green River, Wyoming
 K35CU in Ada, Oklahoma
 K35CZ in Eureka, Utah
 K35DG-D in La Jolla, California
 K35DK-D in Granite Falls, Minnesota
 K35DW in Emery, Utah
 K35FH in Flagstaff, Arizona
 K35FZ in Echo, etc., Utah
 K35GC in Delta, etc., Utah
 K35NI-D in Three Forks, Montana
 KAQY-LP in Lexington, Nebraska
 KEGG-LP in McAlester, Oklahoma
 KHCC-LP in Corpus Christi, Texas
 KIDB-LD in Sweetwater, Texas
 KJPX-LP in Joplin, Missouri
 KWAZ-LP in Lincoln, Nebraska
 W35AV in Black Mountain, North Carolina
 W35BN in Tallahassee, Florida
 WCTX-CD in Virginia Beach, Virginia
 WSWH-LD in Decatur, Alabama
 WUCV-LD in Florence, South Carolina
 WZMC-LP in Jackson, Tennessee

References

35 low-power